The extrinsic incentives bias is an attributional bias according to which people attribute relatively more to "extrinsic incentives" (such as monetary reward) than to "intrinsic incentives" (such as learning a new skill) when weighing the motives of others rather than themselves.

It is a counter-example to the fundamental attribution error as according to the extrinsic bias others are presumed to have situational motivations while oneself is seen as having dispositional motivations. This is the opposite of what the fundamental attribution error would predict. It also might help to explain some of the backfiring effects that can occur when extrinsic incentives are attached to activities that people are intrinsically motivated to do. The term was first proposed by Chip Heath, citing earlier research by others in management science.

Example
In the simplest experiment Heath reported, MBA students were asked to rank the expected job motivations of Citibank customer service representatives. Their average ratings were as follows:

 Amount of pay
 Having job security
 Quality of fringe benefits
 Amount of praise from your supervisor
 Doing something that makes you feel good about yourself
 Developing skills and abilities
 Accomplishing something worthwhile
 Learning new things

Actual customer service representatives rank ordered their own motivations as follows:

 Developing skills and abilities
 Accomplishing something worthwhile
 Learning new things
 Quality of fringe benefits
 Having job security
 Doing something that makes you feel good about yourself
 Amount of pay
 Amount of praise from your supervisor

The order of the predicted and actual reported motivations was nearly reversed; in particular, pay was rated first by others but near last for respondents of themselves. Similar effects were observed when MBA students rated managers and their classmates.

Debiasing
Heath suggests trying to infer others' motivations as one would by inferring one's own motivations.

References

Cognitive biases